Chondroitin sulfate N-acetylgalactosaminyltransferase 1 is an enzyme that in humans is encoded by the CSGALNACT1 gene.

Clinical

A form of mild skeletal dysplasia has been associated with mutations in this gene.

References

Further reading